Thomas Mayer (born 6 February 1984) is a German retired footballer.

References

External links
 
 Thomas Mayer on FuPa.net

1984 births
Living people
People from Schwabmünchen
Sportspeople from Swabia (Bavaria)
German footballers
German football managers
Association football defenders
FC Augsburg II players
SV Wacker Burghausen players
SSV Reutlingen 05 players
3. Liga players
Regionalliga players
Footballers from Bavaria